Blatuša is a village in central Croatia, in the municipality of Gvozd, Sisak-Moslavina County. It is connected by the D6 highway.

Demographics
According to the 2011 census, the village of Blatuša has 171 inhabitants. This represents 30.65% of its pre-war population according to the 1991 census.

According to the 1991 census, 98.03% of the village population were ethnic Serbs (547/558), 0.90 % were Yugoslavs (5/558), while 1.07% were of other ethnic origin (6/558).

Notable people

References

Populated places in Sisak-Moslavina County
Serb communities in Croatia